Salmon River National Forest was established as the Salmon River Forest Reserve by the U.S. Forest Service in Idaho on November 5, 1906 with . It became a National Forest on March 4, 1907. On July 1, 1908 part of the forest was combined with Challis National Forest and part with Salmon National Forest and the name was discontinued.

See also
Salmon National Forest

References

External links
Forest History Society
Forest History Society:Listing of the National Forests of the United States Text from Davis, Richard C., ed. Encyclopedia of American Forest and Conservation History. New York: Macmillan Publishing Company for the Forest History Society, 1983. Vol. II, pp. 743-788.

Former National Forests of Idaho